Yannis Stankoglou (Yiannis Stankoglou, 1974) is a Greek actor.

Biography
Yannis Stankoglou is a Greek actor, working in film and theatre in Greece, Europe and the United States. He has toured internationally with productions of Greek tragedy and modern works, representing Greek theatre in China, Latin America, and Russia. Stankoglou was born in Athens, and worked as a builder and construction worker in his teens, before discovering theatre, attending the Athens Drama School, studying and working in New York, then returning to Greece to become a major figure in the theatre industry.
He is second cousin, with Stefania Liberakakis mother.

Theatre
2011 The Third Wedding (adaptation of novel by Costa Taktsis)
2012 Rainman (theatre version of the film)
2012 Iphigenia in Aulis (Euripides)
2013 Theseus and Ariadne (adaptation by Stratis Pascalis)
2013 I am somebody else (based on the life of Arthur Rimbaud)
2015 Jason and the Golden Fleece (adaptation by Stratis Pascalis)
2016 Victor - Victoria
2018 Junkermann (adapted from the novel by Karagatsis)

Filmography

Film

Television

1974 births
Living people
Greek male actors
21st-century Greek male actors
Male actors from Athens